Egton House in Langham Street in Central London was home to BBC Radio 1 for many years from 1985 until 1996.

Radio 1 moved to Yalding House on Great Portland Street in 1996, and Egton House was demolished in 2003 to make way for the Egton Wing of BBC Broadcasting House, later renamed the John Peel Wing. Jo Whiley was the last presenter to broadcast from Egton House (12pm-2pm on Wednesday 9th October 1996).

Egton House was also home to the BBC Gramophone Library, a collection of over one million records and CDs. The 78 rpm collection was held in the basement of The Langham which is across the road in Langham Place and has now reverted to being a luxury hotel.

References

External links 
Egton House information at Radio Rewind

BBC offices, studios and buildings
Buildings and structures demolished in 2003
Former buildings and structures in the City of Westminster
Media and communications in the City of Westminster
Demolished buildings and structures in London